Jonathan Renaldo Barry (born 20 June 1988) is a Bahamian cricketer. Barry is a right-handed batsman who bowls right-arm medium pace and currently represents the Bahamas national cricket team.

Barry made his Twenty20 debut for the Bahamas against the Cayman Islands in the 1st round of the 2006 Stanford 20/20.  He played his second and final Twenty20 match to date for the Bahamas in the 1st round of the 2008 Stanford 20/20 against Jamaica.

Barry represented the Bahamas in 2008 ICC World Cricket League Division Five and the 2010 ICC Americas Championship Division 2.  Barry represented the Bahamas in the 2010 ICC Americas Championship Division 1.

In July 2019, he was named in the Bahamian squad for their tour of Bermuda.

In October 2021, Barry was named in the Bahamas Twenty20 International (T20I) squad for the 2021 ICC Men's T20 World Cup Americas Qualifier tournament in Antigua. He made his T20I debut on 7 November 2021, for the Bahamas against Canada.

References

External links
Jonathan Barry at Cricinfo
Jonathan Barry at CricketArchive

1988 births
Living people
Bahamian cricketers
Bahamas Twenty20 International cricketers